Amada María Peralta Cabrera (born 14 June 1994) is a Paraguayan footballer who plays as a forward for Cerro Porteño and the Paraguay women's national team.

International career
Peralta played for Paraguay at senior level in the 2018 Copa América Femenina.

International goals
Scores and results list Paraguay's goal tally first

References

1994 births
Living people
Women's association football forwards
Paraguayan women's footballers
Paraguay women's international footballers
Cerro Porteño players